District Regionalism is a finance-related urban planning method. The practice creates a neighborhood stock system in which community shares are sold. The term "District Regionalism" was initially used by the administration of the city of Guthrie, Kentucky as the distinctive traits of each neighborhood emerged during the trial study. The University of Kentucky's College of Design became instrumental in devising the study concept, parameters and goals. The practice concerns organizing cities into smaller communities by allowing creating and distinctive regional and cultural references emerge within neighborhoods by allowing the public to transform what is typically considered as government owned areas and blighted properties. The practice has been proven to alter larger sprawling co-dependent cities into smaller self-reliant communities.

Share System 
Community shares are sold in District Regionalist environments.  As a community is defined by boundaries and image, the collective population of that community issues shares with monetary value. Initially, stock ownership is given to the community in order to promote the process. An increased number of shares allows a larger number of voting privileges within that community, therefore allowing some margin within city ordinances and zoning.  As more community shares are sold, the pool increases for that community allowing them greater ability to project that money towards community projects. In a District Regionalist community, the city never loses over 51% of shares, allowing the city government to retain rights to city property and have majority rule voting privileges.  As improvements are made to community properties, land values increase and improve the value of private properties within those districts. Cities can also use the community district funding pool to match grants at the discretion of a district's approval.  The share system operates on the premise that communities will care for what they own, as opposed to caring for properties owned by cities.

Urban planning